Romantic Rogue is a 1927 American silent comedy film directed by Harry Joe Brown and starring Reed Howes, Ena Gregory and Syd Crossley. It was distributed by the independent Rayart Pictures, the forerunner of Monogram Pictures.

Synopsis
Hart Lawson, the heir to a wealthy patent medicine family who are all in bad health, rejects their view that he too is sickly and sets out to demonstrate his healthiness.

Cast
 Reed Howes as 	Hart Lawson
 Ena Gregory as 	Barbara Warrington
 James Bradbury Sr. as 	Uncle Arch Lawson 
 Syd Crossley as 	Uncle Reg Lawson
 Cuyler Supplee as 	Harry Lawson

References

Bibliography
 Munden, Kenneth White. The American Film Institute Catalog of Motion Pictures Produced in the United States, Part 1. University of California Press, 1997.

External links
 

1920s American films
1927 films
1927 comedy films
1920s English-language films
American silent feature films
Silent American comedy films
American black-and-white films
Films directed by Harry Joe Brown
Rayart Pictures films